Stripped may refer to:

Music
 "Stripped" (song), by Depeche Mode, 1986
 Stripped (Christina Aguilera album) or the title song, 2002
 Stripped (Daniel Ash album), 2014
 Stripped (Macy Gray album), 2016
 Stripped (Pretty Maids album), 1993
 Stripped (Rolling Stones album), 1995
 Stripped (We the Kings album), 2014
 Stripped (Hinder EP), 2016
 Stripped, an EP by Dylan Scott, 2018
 Stripped, an EP by The Score, 2017
 Stripped, an EP by Sam Smith, 2020
 Stripped, an album by Stage Dolls, 1991
 "Stripped", a song by Neurosis on their album Souls at Zero, 1992

Other uses
 Stripped (film), a 2014 American documentary film
 Stripped (franchise), a reality-documentary television series with several international versions
 Stripped (tour), a 2009 comedy tour by Eddie Izzard

See also
 
 Strip (disambiguation)